These hits topped the Ultratop 50 in 2001.

See also
2001 in music

References

2001 in Belgium
2001 record charts
2001